Olga of Württemberg (1 March 1876 – 21 October 1932) was a daughter of Duke Eugen of Württemberg and Grand Duchess Vera Constantinovna of Russia. She married Prince Maximilian of Schaumburg-Lippe.<ref name = " Willis 162">Willis, The Romanovs in the 21st Century, p. 162</ref>

Early life and family
Princess Olga was born at Stuttgart, Württemberg, the younger twin daughter of Duke Eugen of Württemberg (1846–1877), (son of Duke Eugen of Württemberg, and Princess Mathilde of Schaumburg-Lippe) and his wife, Grand Duchess Vera Constantinovna of Russia (1854–1912), (daughter of Grand Duke Konstantin Nikolayevich of Russia and Princess Alexandra of Saxe-Altenburg). Her older twin was Duchess Elsa of Württemberg (1876–1936). They did not look alike and Olga, much taller than her sister, seemed to be the elder of the two.

 Marriage and issue 

There were plans to marry Duchess Olga to Prince Maximilian of Baden, but he ultimately married Princess Marie Louise of Hanover. In March 1898 there were reports of her engagement to Prince Eugen of Sweden, the youngest son of King Oscar II of Sweden. The marriage never occurred. Prince Eugen, a notable artist, remained a bachelor.

Olga married Prince Maximilian of Schaumburg-Lippe (13 March 1871 – 1 April 1904) on 3 November 1898 at Stuttgart, Baden-Württemberg. He was a son of Wilhelm, Prince of Schaumburg-Lippe, and Bathildis, Princess of Anhalt-Dessau.

Their marriage lasted less than six years. Her husband died young. They had three children:
Prince Eugen of Schaumburg-Lippe (8 August 1899 – 9 November 1929). He died unmarried at age 30 at Caterham, Surrey, England, in a plane crash.
Prince Albrecht of Schaumburg-Lippe (17 October 1900 – 20 May 1984). He married on 2 September 1930 Baroness Walburga von Hirschberg (26 March 1906 – 10 April 1986). They had no children. He had a daughter with Baroness Marie-Gabriele von Pfetten-Arnbach (10 June 1927 – 14 February 2015) Andrea of Schaumburg-Lippe (Born 19 September 1960). She married on 4 September 1993 Count Franz von Degenfeld-Schonburg. They had three children.
Prince Bernhard of Schaumburg-Lippe (8 December 1902 – 24 June 1903). Died in childhood.

Ancestry

Notes

References
Willis, Daniel. The Romanovs in the 21st Century: a genealogical Biography'',VDM, 2009.
thePeerage.com - Olga Herzogin von Württemberg

External links

1876 births
1932 deaths
Nobility from Stuttgart
Duchesses of Württemberg
House of Lippe
Princesses of Schaumburg-Lippe
German twins